In Ohio, State Route 670 may refer to:
Interstate 670 in Ohio, the only Ohio highway numbered 670 since about 1974
Ohio State Route 670 (1930s-1970s), now SR 761 and part of SR 313